Margaret Adams was an Australian aviator.

Life
In 1938, Adams, who was from Sydney, was active in forming the Australian Women's Flying Club (AWFC). She was elected the inaugural president in September 1938. The club was intended as a social club for women pilots, and by 1939 the club had 300 members. Members underwent first aid courses, and studied aircraft engineering and navigation. They also made comforts, such as socks, for the Royal Australian Air Force. In 1940 the Women's Air Training Corps was formed and the clubs became part of that organisation.

In 1958, Adams, by then married and using her married name (Kentley) joined the international women pilots' organisation the Ninety-Nines. In 1960, she and Maie Casey received the charter for the Australian chapter of the organisation at a reception at the Royal Aero Club in London, England.

References

Australian aviators
Australian women in World War II
People from Sydney
1988 deaths